The Haman Formation is an Early Cretaceous geological formation in South Korea. It has been dated to the Albian, with an estimated maximum depositional age of 105.4 ± 0.4 Ma. The deposit is known for its tracks, including those of dinosaurs, pterosaurs and birds. It overlies the Silla Conglomerate which overlies the Chilgok Formation. It is laterally equivalent to the Sagog Formation.

Vertebrate paleofauna 
Fossil pterosaur, theropod, sauropod and ornithopod tracks have been recovered from this formation. Some dinosaur tracks show signs of display behavior. Dinosaur skin impressions have also been found in this formation.

Ichnofossils

See also 

 
 List of fossil sites
 Geoncheonri Formation
 Gugyedong Formation
 Hasandong Formation
 Jinju Formation

References 

Geologic formations of South Korea
Lower Cretaceous Series of Asia
Cretaceous South Korea
Albian Stage
Sandstone formations
Siltstone formations
Ichnofossiliferous formations
Paleontology in South Korea